The 1940 Liga Bet season was the second-tier league of the Palestine League organized by the EIFA. The league was split into three regional divisions: North, Samaria and South. The Samaria division was won by Degel Zion Tel Aviv, while Hapoel Hadera won the North division and a British military team, RSG, which competed in the league as a guest, won the South Division.

At the end of the season, Degel Zion, Hapoel Hadera and Hapoel Rishon LeZion (who finished as runners-up in the South division) competed for promotions to the top division. Hapoel Rishon leZion and Degel Zion won the two top places and were promoted.

Regular season results

North division
8 teams competed in the division, with Hapoel Hadera winning the league with a perfect record.

League Clubs:
Bar Kochva Haifa
Beitar Haifa
Hapoel Binyamina
Hapoel Hadera (division champions; advanced to promotion play-offs)
Hapoel Kfar Ata
Maccabi Binyamina
Maccabi Hadera
Maccabi Haifa

Samaria division

South division

Promotion play-offs

References
1939/1940 Season Hapoel Petah Tikva Museum 
In Liga Bet Samaria division Davar, 26.5.40, Historical Jewish Press 

Liga Bet seasons
Palestine
Palestine
2
2